The canton of Grande-Synthe is an administrative division of the Nord department, northern France. Its borders were modified at the French canton reorganisation which came into effect in March 2015. Its seat is in Grande-Synthe.

It consists of the following communes:

Bourbourg
Brouckerque
Cappelle-Brouck
Craywick
Drincham
Dunkirk (partly)
Grande-Synthe
Grand-Fort-Philippe
Gravelines
Looberghe
Loon-Plage
Pitgam
Saint-Georges-sur-l'Aa
Saint-Pierre-Brouck

References

Cantons of Nord (French department)